Desmond Trufant (born September 10, 1990) is an American football cornerback who is a free agent. He was drafted by the Atlanta Falcons in the first round of the 2013 NFL Draft. He played college football at Washington.

Early years
Trufant attended Woodrow Wilson High School in Tacoma, Washington. He was named first-team all-state by the Seattle Times following his senior season, and also earned a spot on the Seattle Times preseason all-state team. He was named to the All-Narrows League first team as both a running back and cornerback as a senior, after posting 47 tackles and eight interceptions as a junior, when he was an All-Narrows League first-team cornerback.

Trufant was also a standout long jumper and triple jumper on the Rams' track team, and took second place in the Class 4A state track meet in the triple jump (46 feet, 5.75 inches) and 11th in the long jump (21 feet, 2.25 inches) as a junior in 2008. He also played basketball at Wilson, earning second-team all-league as a junior.

Considered a three-star recruit by Rivals.com, Trufant was rated the 56th best cornerback in the nation. He accepted a scholarship to Washington over offers from Arizona State, Oregon and Washington State, brother Marcus' alma mater.

College career
Trufant attended the University of Washington, where he played for the Washington Huskies football team from 2009 to 2012.  As a senior, he was a first-team All-Pac-12 Conference selection. The Huskies were ranked No. 16 in the nation (second in the Pac-12) in pass defense (188.9 yards allowed per game) at the end of the regular 2012 college football season.

Professional career

Atlanta Falcons

2013
The Atlanta Falcons selected Trufant in the first round (22nd overall) of the 2013 NFL Draft. He was the third cornerback selected in 2013, behind Alabama's Dee Milliner (9th overall) and Houston's D. J. Hayden (12th overall), and was also the first of two cornerbacks the Falcons selected, along with second round pick Robert Alford (60th overall). 

On July 24, 2013, the Atlanta Falcons signed Trufant to a four-year, $8.16 million contract that includes $6.94 million guaranteed and a signing bonus of $4.31 million.

Throughout training camp, he competed for a job as a starting cornerback against Asante Samuel, Robert McClain, and Robert Alford. Head coach Mike Smith named Samuel and Trufant the starting cornerbacks to begin the regular season.

He made his professional regular season debut and first career start in the Atlanta Falcons' season-opener at the New Orleans Saints and made five combined tackles and a pass deflection in a 23–17 loss. In Week 7, Trufant recorded a season-high seven combined tackles and broke up a pass during a 31–23 victory against the Tampa Bay Buccaneers. On November 3, 2013, Trufant recorded five combined tackles, a pass deflection, and his first career interception off a pass by quarterback Cam Newton in the Falcons' 34–10 loss at the Carolina Panthers. On December 15, 2013, Trufant tied his season-high with seven combined tackles, two pass deflections, and intercepted a pass by quarterback Kirk Cousins in their 27–26 victory against the Washington Redskins.
He exceeded expectations, being ranked eighth out of all cornerbacks in the league by Pro Football Focus and allowed a 53.% completion percentage and a quarterback rating of 75.2 to opposing quarterbacks in pass coverage.

2014
Trufant became the Falcons' No. 1 cornerback after they released Asante Samuel. He was officially named the starting cornerback, alongside Robert Alford, to begin the regular season. On November 9, 2014, Trufant recorded a season-high seven combined tackles and a pass deflection during their 27–17 victory at the Tampa Bay Buccaneers. The following week, he made a season-high two pass deflections and intercepted a pass by Cam Newton in a 19–17 victory at the Carolina Panthers. On December 29, 2014, the Atlanta Falcons fired head coach Mike Smith after the Falcons did not qualify for the playoffs after finishing with a 4–12 record. Trufant finished the  season with 61 combined tackles (53 solo), 16 pass deflections, and three interceptions in 16 games and 16 starts.

2015
New head coach Dan Quinn retained Trufant and Alford as the starting cornerback duo. In Week 11, Trufant recorded four combined tackles, two pass deflections, and his first career sack on quarterback Matt Hasselbeck during a 21–24 loss to the Indianapolis Colts. The following week, he collected a season-high six solo tackles in the Falcons' 20–10 loss to the Minnesota Vikings. He finished the  season with 42 combined tackles (35 solo), 11 pass deflections, a sack, and an interception in 16 games and 16 starts. That season, Trufant received his first Pro Bowl selection when was named an alternate to the 2016 Pro Bowl.

2016
He started the Atlanta Falcons' season-opener against the Tampa Bay Buccaneers and collected a season-high five combined tackles, broke up a pass, and intercepted a pass by Jameis Winston during a 31–24 loss. On October 16, 2016, Trufant made five combined tackles and a sack on Russell Wilson in the Falcons' 26-24 loss at the Seattle Seahawks. In Week 9, Trufant made four solo tackles before leaving the Falcons' 43–28 victory against the Tampa Bay Buccaneers in the first half after suffering a shoulder injury. On November 29, 2016, the Atlanta Falcons placed Trufant on injured reserve after they discovered he would require shoulder surgery. Pro Football Focus gave Trufant an overall grade of 78.9, ranking 30th among all qualifying cornerbacks in 2016. He finished the  season with 31 combined tackles (25 solo), four pass deflections, two sacks, and an interception in nine games and nine starts.

The Atlanta Falcons went to Super Bowl LI after finishing atop the NFC South with an 11–5 record and defeating the Seattle Seahawks in the NFC Divisional Round and the Green Bay Packers in the NFC Championship. On February 5, 2017, the Atlanta Falcons lost 34–28 in overtime to the New England Patriots in Super Bowl LI after leading 28–9 going into the fourth quarter.

2017
On April 8, 2017, the Atlanta Falcons signed Trufant to a five-year, $68.5 million contract that includes $41.52 million and $15 million signing bonus.

New defensive coordinator Marquand Manuel who replaced Rick Smith after the Falcons' collapse in Super Bowl LI. In Week 2, Trufant recorded two solo tackles, broke up a pass, an interception, and recovered a fumble off a strip sack by Vic Beasley and returned it 15-yards for a touchdown during a 34–23 victory against the Green Bay Packers on NBC Sunday Night Football. His performance earned him NFC Defensive Player of the Week. On November 20, 2017, Trufant made five solo tackles, a season-high three pass deflections, and intercepted a pass by Russell Wilson during a 34–31 victory at the Seattle Seahawks. Trufant was inactive for the Falcons' Week 13 loss to the Minnesota Vikings due to a concussion he received he previous week. He finished the  season with 41 combined tackles (36 solo), 12 pass deflections, two interceptions, a sack, a fumble recovery, and a touchdown in 15 games and 15 starts. Pro Football Focus gave Trufant an overall grade of 84.9, which ranked 19th among all qualified cornerbacks in 2017.

2018

In 2018, Trufant started all 16 games, recording 66 tackles, one sack, a team-high 12 passes defensed, and no interceptions.

2019
In Week 2 against the Philadelphia Eagles, Trufant intercepted quarterback Carson Wentz twice in the 24–20 win. Trufant missed four games in the middle of the season due to a toe injury he suffered during Week 5 against the Houston Texans. In Week 11 against the Carolina Panthers, Trufant recorded 6 tackles and an interception in the 29–3 win. In Week 12 against the Tampa Bay Buccaneers, Trufant had two passes defended and an interception. Trufant broke his forearm in Week 14, during the win against the Carolina Panthers, and was ruled out for the rest of the season. Trufant started 9 games during the season, recording 18 tackles, 7 passes defended, and a career-high four interceptions.

On March 18, 2020, Trufant was released by the Falcons after seven seasons.

Detroit Lions
On March 25, 2020, Trufant signed a two-year, $21 million contract with the Detroit Lions.

In Week 9 against the Minnesota Vikings, Trufant recorded his first sack as a Lion on Kirk Cousins during the 34–20 loss.
In Week 11 against the Carolina Panthers, Trufant recorded his first interception as a Lion off a pass thrown by P. J. Walker during the 20–0 loss. He was placed on injured reserve on December 2, 2020.

On March 17, 2021, Trufant was released by the Lions.

Chicago Bears
Trufant signed a one-year contract with the Chicago Bears on March 20, 2021. On August 13, Trufant left Bears camp to be with his father, who was critically ill. On August 31, Trufant was released by the Bears.

New Orleans Saints
On September 7, 2021, Trufant signed with the New Orleans Saints. He played in two games before being released on October 12.

Las Vegas Raiders
On October 19, 2021, Trufant signed with the Las Vegas Raiders.

Career statistics

Personal life
Trufant's brothers, Marcus and Isaiah, have both played cornerback in the NFL. Marcus Trufant had a ten-year career with nine seasons as a member of the Seattle Seahawks (-) and Isaiah Trufant was a journeyman with multiple teams during a five-year career, three of which he spent with the New York Jets (-).

On August 15, 2021, Trufant's father died, and Trufant left the Chicago Bears training camp to be with his family.

References

External links

 Atlanta Falcons bio

1990 births
Living people
Players of American football from Tacoma, Washington
American football cornerbacks
Washington Huskies football players
Atlanta Falcons players
Detroit Lions players
Chicago Bears players
New Orleans Saints players
Las Vegas Raiders players
Unconferenced Pro Bowl players